Odin Borson, the All-Father is a fictional character appearing in American comic books published by Marvel Comics. First mentioned in Journey into Mystery #85 (Oct. 1962), the character first appears in Journey into Mystery #86 (Nov. 1962), and was adapted from the Odin of Norse mythology by Stan Lee and Jack Kirby. The character is depicted as the father of Thor and former king of Asgard.

Sir Anthony Hopkins portrayed the character in the Marvel Cinematic Universe (MCU) films Thor (2011), Thor: The Dark World (2013), and Thor: Ragnarok (2017).

Publication history

Although Odin was first mentioned in Journey into Mystery #85 (Oct. 1962), his first actual appearance was in Journey into Mystery #86 (November 1962). He was created for Marvel Comics by Stan Lee and Jack Kirby.

Fictional character biography
According to Norse mythology, Odin is the son of Bor (father, one of the first Asgardians) and Bestla (mother, a frost giantess), and the full brother of Vili and Ve. With the aid of his brothers, a young Odin defeats the fire demon Surtur; later, Odin reveals that his brothers were killed by Surtur, but gave their power to Odin. Later Surtur was imprisoned inside the Earth. Odin thereafter became ruler of Asgard, where he received the epithet of All-Father, and eventually fell in love with the elder goddess, Gaea, by whom he is the father of Thor. After Thor's birth, Odin returns to Asgard, where his wife, Frigga, acts as Thor's mother. Odin is also the adoptive father of Loki, a child of Giant ancestry whose father King Laufey is killed by Odin in battle: adopted in a deal with Bor's spirit, unaware of Bor's intention that the child would bring about Odin's downfall. Despite Odin's intentions, Thor and Loki become bitter enemies. Odin also was the father of Balder from Frigga.

Thor's preoccupation with Midgard (Earth) is a constant annoyance to Odin who, as punishment, has deprived Thor of his powers on at least three occasions. Each time, Thor's willingness to atone for his transgressions, his continued noble intentions, and his bravery, eventually convince Odin to restore his original powers and identity.

As ruler and protector of the Asgardian people, Odin has been involved in a number of crises that have threatened Asgard and, on occasion, Earth. Notable examples included stopping Loki, the Storm Giant Skagg, and Surtur (with the aid of Thor and Balder); defeating the Absorbing Man after he absorbs almost all of Asgard; banishing the monster Mangog; sacrificing his right eye to Mimir for the wisdom to stop Ragnarök (Twilight of the Gods); attempting to stop the Celestials in the armor of the Destroyer; engaging inter-dimensional tyrant Dormammu in a "cosmic chess" match as champions of Master Order and Lord Chaos respectively, and preventing Surtur from lighting the Sword of Doom, Twilight.

Odin has also died three times in defense of Asgard. On the first occasion, Odin is killed by Mangog, and later revived by Hela. On the second occasion, the Celestials melt the Destroyer, and thus stifle all Asgardians except Thor, who collects a portion of energy from each pantheon and uses it to revive Odin, who in turn resurrects the Asgardians.

The final occasion involves a massive battle against Surtur on Earth, with Odin apparently dying once and for all, when the Odin Force—the source of Odin's power—migrates to his son, Thor. As Thor eventually destroys the Loom of Fates and stops Asgard from perpetuating Ragnarok—which ends the entire Norse pantheon and Asgard itself—Thor believes Odin may be dead permanently. The Odin Force appears to him in humanoid form and says that this was Odin's plan all along.

When Thor returns from hibernation in the void, he begins to find the lost Asgardians, but does not search for his father. During his Odinsleep, Thor finds Odin in a limbo wherein every day he does battle with Surtur. Odin declines Thor's offer of taking his place—noting that just Thor's offer has broken Bor's curse that he would be abandoned as Bor was—and states that Thor must lead the Asgardians, while Odin continues in a state approximating the Asgardian equivalent of heaven, to prevent Surtur from reentering the world. Loki assuages Doctor Doom's fears about Odin's potential wrath if the Asgardians move to Latveria, assuring him that "Old One-Eye is yesterday's god" and "a relic". Later, Odin's absence from the Nine Worlds leads his revived father Bor to wage battle against Thor after Loki and Hela revive him. When Bor is killed, Loki and Balder have Thor exiled for regicide.

During the "Siege" storyline, Norman Osborn sends the Thunderbolts to steal Odin's spear Gungnir from the Asgardian weaponry. Loki calls on Odin to return the Norn Stones to him so he can empower the heroes to defeat the Void.

Odin returns from the dead after Asgard is invaded by the World-Eaters.

During the "Fear Itself" storyline, Odin senses the return of his elder brother, Cul, the Serpent: God of Fear. After a brief monologue with Uatu the Watcher, Odin commands his people to return to the Asgardian plane against the protests of Thor, and Asgard rebuilds into a war engine with which he intends to raze Earth completely, to destroy the Serpent. Thor convinces Odin to send him back to Earth instead, and Iron Man travels to Asgard-space for an audience with Odin, wherein Iron Man asks Odin if he can use one of Asgard's workshops to make weapons, and Odin allows him to use the Workshops of Svartalfheim, to stop the Serpent before his shadow falls on the World Tree. Captain America and the Avengers bring an unconscious Thor to Broxton so that Odin can heal Thor. As he tends to his son, Odin confesses that he has always tried to prevent Thor's prophesied death by the Serpent, not to prevent Ragnarok, but because he loves his son and does not want to see him perish. Odin prepares Thor by giving him the armor and helmet that he himself wore the last time he cast out the Serpent and gives Thor the Odinsword, named Ragnarok (which was forged to end all things). While Thor kills the Serpent at the cost of his own life, Odin frees those affected by the Hammers of the Worthy, and returns to Asgard with the corpse of the Serpent sealing off Asgard from Hermod and a number of other Asgardians left on Earth.

During the "Original Sin" storyline, it is revealed to Thor that Angela is the daughter of Odin and Frigga; "killed" as an infant during Asgard's war with the Angels of the Tenth Realm, whereupon Odin severed the tenth realm from the other nine as "punishment". Odin was later freed from his self-exile by Loki as he is set to return to Asgard. The fight between Thor and Angela is interrupted when Odin recognizes Angela as his daughter and reveals Angela's true history, wherein an Angel raised her as one of the Angels under the name of Angela. Due to her services for the Angels, the Queen pardoned Angela her life, but exiled her from Heaven for her lineage. After leaving Heaven, Odin tells Thor, Loki, and Angela that he still loves his children.

Angered that someone else is wielding Mjolnir, Odin sends the Destroyer after the new female Thor, appointing his brother Cul Borson as his new 'Minister of Justice' to enforce his new decrees and operate the Destroyer, but Odinson and Freyja assemble an army of female superheroes to aid her, forcing Odin to stand down.

During the "Last Days" part of the Secret Wars storyline, Odin dreams of the end of all existence in an event greater than Ragnarok. When the Asgardians gather to witness King Loki (a more evil version of Loki from an alternate future) on the back of the Midgard Serpent where they believe that this will be their end, Odin and Frigga appear with machine guns to defend the Asgardians.

As part of the All-New, All-Different Marvel, Odin has become a tyrant ruling Asgard with an iron fist ever since Thor Odinson went missing. He makes use of the Thunder Guard and the Destroyer Armor to protect his kingdom and even went so far as to imprison Frigga and anyone who gets in his way. His reason for imprisoning Frigga is because she assisted the female Thor against the Destroyer. Odin fought the female Thor when she interrupted Frigga's trial. After the battle is halted when Loki used a poisoned dagger on Frigga, Odin took Frigga's body to his Odinsleep chamber where he placed some of his powers into her.

During the "Generations" anthology, Odin reminisces with the Phoenix Force about their previous love affair. It was later revealed that Odin was part of the Avengers of 1,000,000 BC alongside Agamotto and 1,000,000 BC versions of Black Panther, Ghost Rider, Iron Fist, Phoenix, and Star Brand.

During the "Death of Thor" arc, Odin faced the return of Mangog and was unable to defeat it. Odin and the Asgardians were saved by the female Thor who slew Mangog at the cost of Mjolnir. The female Thor then regressed back to Jane Foster and succumbed to her cancer. Upon giving respect to Jane Foster, Odin worked with Thor to channel the powers of God Tempest to resurrect Jane Foster.

During the "War of the Realms" storyline, Odin is in his throne room pondering how he could defeat Malekith the Accursed with the Bifrost Bridge was destroyed during a battle against Mangog and Asgard in shambles. Suddenly, Odin is targeted by Malekith's assassins and Malekith's assassins revealed that they have created a Dark Bifrost Bridge that will allow them to teleport to any of the nine realms Odin survives the attempt on his life. Jane Foster slams Skidbladnir into Enchantress when Odin and his Asgardian Army arrive. Odin is enraged when he finds out that Laufey ate Loki. After the Avengers and their allies retreat to Avengers Mountain, Ghost Rider and Sif take Odin to rest. After Thor was rescued from Jotunheim and is placed in the infirmary, Odin wakes up and demands to know where Frigga is. Captain America tries telling Odin that he can't go fighting while injured. Iron Man reveals that he, Shuri, and Screwbeard the Dwarf created an armor that is a mixture of uru and vibranium for Odin to assist him in battle. Before Malekith can kill Frigga, Odin arrives in his new armor and buys time for Frigga to destroy the Black Bifrost Bridge where its blast seemingly kills them both while defeating Malekith's forces. Before they are engulfed in the blast, Odin and Frigga share a kiss. The two of them survived and are held captive by Malekith at Stonehenge. When Odin shouts to Thor not to rescue them as it is a trap, Malekith stabs him to keep him quiet. When Frigga states to Malekith that he should flee while he still can, Malekith plans to cause the death of Thor as Odin tells Frigga to pray to Thor. Odin advised Jane Foster against using the damaged Earth-1610 Mjolnir. After Malekith is killed by the Wild Hunt and peace occurs across the Ten Realms, Odin steps down and makes Thor the new All-Father.

Powers and abilities
As King of the Norse Gods, Odin possesses vast strength, stamina and durability far greater than that of a normal Asgardian, along with resistance to all Earthly diseases and toxins, incredible resistance to magic and, as a courtesy of the Golden Apples of Idunn, a greatly extended lifespan. Odin has all the abilities of his son Thor, but to a much greater degree. Odin is capable of manipulating the Odinforce—a powerful source of energy—for a number of purposes, including energy projection; creation of illusions and force fields; levitation; molecular manipulation, communicating telepathically with other Asgardians even if they are on Earth and he is in Asgard, hypnotizing humans; channelling lightning to Earth from Asgard, controlling the lifeforces of all Asgardians, and teleportation. The character has also used the Odinforce for greater feats such as transporting the entire human race to an alternate dimension; stopping time; pulling the remains of distant planets down from outer space to crush his foes, compressing the population of an entire planet into a single being, the Mangog and then recreating the race and taking a soul away from the arch-demon Mephisto. The Odinforce makes Odin capable of destroying entire galaxies, allowing him to engage entities such as Galactus on their own terms. In some stories, Odin has been portrayed at a universal or even multiversal scale of power.

In battles against opponents of similar power, Odin carries the magical spear Gungnir ("The Spear of Heaven"), an artifact made of the metal uru, that can be used to channel the Odinforce. Even without the Odinforce it can still match Thor's hammer in battle. Once a year, during the Asgardian winter, Odin must undertake the Odinsleep for 24 hours to regenerate (and is closely guarded as he is vulnerable during this period), although he can be wakened by potent spells, such as those of Karnilla the Norn Queen.

Odin is also a master tactician and schemer, and has prevented Ragnarok, and planned for centuries for the coming of the Celestial Fourth Host. The character also on occasion uses the eight-legged steed Sleipnir and the enchanted ship Skipbladnir, which can navigate the "sea of space" and be shrunk to the size of a toy.

Reception
 In 2020, CBR.com ranked Odin 3rd in their "10 Marvel Gods With The Highest Kill Count" list.

Other versions

Ultimate Marvel
In the Ultimate Marvel imprint, Odin is referenced as far back as The Ultimates (mostly by Thor), but the way the series is initially written leaves the reader unsure whether or not Odin or Asgard actually exist as Thor is portrayed as human with Norse god delusions and technology that gives him his godlike powers. In the final issue of The Ultimates 2, Thor proves his claims to be a genuine god by killing Thor and summoning an army of Asgardian warriors to help the Ultimates defend Loki's army of monsters. Thor references Odin in his last conversation with Loki before he destroys him, sending him back to Odin. When the Ultimates begin to be financed by Tony Stark after their retirement from S.H.I.E.L.D., Thor informs that this is indeed the will of Odin.

In Ultimate Comics: Thor, a prequel to The Ultimates, Odin explains to Thor that he is Asgard, and when he dies Asgard will be destroyed with him. He also informs that the Norn Stones and Mjolnir are extensions of his own power. When Loki leads an army of Frost Giants to invade and destroy Asgard, Odin forces Loki into the Room With No Doors and is killed in the battle with Mammoth. Asgard disintegrates around him with Thor giving one last powerful strike at his enemies. In present day, leading up to The Ultimates, Thor and Balder are reincarnated as mortals and Balder (reincarnated as the Ultimate version of Donald Blake) explains that the Gods are to be restored and Odin will return to rule Asgard again.

He is later killed in Ultimate Comics: The Ultimates but unlike the tradition of Ultimate Marvel characters to remain deceased, Odin and the other Asgardians are still active (of sorts), as they appear to Thor in visions and act as a sixth sense for him. This is because Thor has "become Valhalla".

Spider-Geddon 
In the universe of Spider-Punk, Eric Masters mentions Odin as the one responsible for giving his powers.

In other media

Television
 Odin appears in The Mighty Thor segment of The Marvel Super Heroes, voiced by Bernard Cowan.
 Odin appears in The Super Hero Squad Show, voiced by Jess Harnell.
 Odin appears in The Avengers: Earth's Mightiest Heroes, voiced by Clancy Brown.
 Odin appears in the Ultimate Spider-Man episode "Field Trip". He is shown in his Odinsleep at the time when Loki leads the Frost Giants into attacking Asgard.
 Odin appears in Avengers Assemble, voiced by Frank Welker.
 Odin appears in the Hulk and the Agents of S.M.A.S.H. episode "Days of Future Smash: Smashgard", voiced again by Frank Welker.
 Odin appears in Guardians of the Galaxy, voiced again by Frank Welker.
 Odin appears in the Marvel Future Avengers episode "Can You Believe in Loki", voiced by Bin Sasaki in Japanese and Fred Tatasciore in the English dub.

Film

 Odin appears in Ultimate Avengers 2, voiced by Dwight Schultz.
 Odin appears in Hulk vs. Thor, voiced by French Tickner.
 Odin appears in Thor: Tales of Asgard, voiced by Christopher Britton.
 Anthony Hopkins portrays Odin in the films set in the Marvel Cinematic Universe (MCU):
 Odin first appears in Thor. Hopkins reprised his role of Odin in Thor: The Dark World and Thor: Ragnarok, also portraying Loki impersonating Odin.

Video games
 Odin appears in Marvel: Ultimate Alliance, voiced by Peter Renaday.
 Odin appears in Thor: God of Thunder (based on the live-action film), voiced by Tom Kane.
 Odin appears as a downloadable content character in Lego Marvel Super Heroes, voiced by John DiMaggio.
 Odin appears as a playable character in Lego Marvel's Avengers, voiced again by Frank Welker.
 Odin appears as a non-playable character in Facebook's game Marvel: Avengers Alliance.
 Odin appears as a playable character in Marvel Future Fight.
 Odin appears as a collectable card in Marvel Snap.

Motion comics
 Odin appears in the Thor & Loki: Blood Brothers motion comic, voiced by Joe Teiger.

Miscellaneous
 Odin appears in the Robot Chicken episode "Dear Consumer" voiced by Greg Grunberg.

References

External links
 Odin at Marvel.com

Characters created by Jack Kirby
Characters created by Stan Lee
Comics characters introduced in 1962
Fictional characters missing an eye
Fictional characters who can manipulate time
Fictional characters with dimensional travel abilities
Fictional characters with electric or magnetic abilities
Fictional characters with elemental transmutation abilities
Fictional characters with energy-manipulation abilities
Fictional characters with slowed ageing
Fictional characters with superhuman durability or invulnerability
Fictional gods
Fictional hypnotists and indoctrinators
Fictional kings
Fictional polearm and spearfighters
Male characters in film
Marvel Comics Asgardians
Marvel Comics characters who can move at superhuman speeds
Marvel Comics characters who can teleport
Marvel Comics characters who use magic
Marvel Comics characters with accelerated healing
Marvel Comics characters with superhuman strength
Marvel Comics film characters
Marvel Comics male characters
Marvel Comics telepaths
Odin